Mithila Makhana (botanical name: Euryale ferox Salisb.)  is a special variety  of aquatic fox nut cultivated in Mithila region of Bihar and Nepal. In Mithila, Makhana is also termed as Makhan. It is the one of the three prestigious cultural identity of Mithila: Pond, Fish and Makhan "पग-पग पोखर, माछ, मखान  ". It is also very famous in Kojagara festival of Maithil Brahmins and Kaysath celebrated for newly married couples. Makhana contains protein and fiber, along with micronutrients like calcium, magnesium, iron, and phosphorus. 

Bihar Agricultural University, Sabour facilitated for Geographical indication tagging for Mithila Makhana. Subsequently, in April 2022, it received fifth Geographical indication by the efforts of Darbhanga MP Gopal Jee Thakur for Bihar from the Government of India.  Darbhanga MP has many times demanded the GI tag for Mithila Makhana in the Parliament of India. GI has been registered in the name of Mithilanchal Makhana Utpadak Sangh, Purnia. Postal Department of India started courier service of Mithila Makhana in Bihar from 28th January of 2021.

Health Benefits 
Makhana is a healthy Indian snack cultivated majorly in the Mithila region of Bihar state in India. The seeds of the product are edible after they are processed. The seeds are put into  very high temperature hot sand and then it is fried. After that the seeds got exploded and become snacks to eat like pop corn. It has lower cholesterol, fat and sodium, therefore it also an ideal weight-loss snack as it is low in calories. It has also a high nutritional value and is a rich source of proteins, carbohydrates, fibre, potassium, iron, and zinc. It also help us to overcome insomnia and arthritis, and improve cognitive functions. Makhana is rich in anti-oxidant and anti-inflammatory properties and therefore, it is also beneficial for heart health along with controlling blood sugar.

References 

Mithila
Aquatic plants
Geographical indications

See Also 
 Darbhanga
 Madhubani
 Maithili Language
 Mithila Painting